Ocotea basicordatifolia is a species of Ocotea in the plant family Lauraceae.

Distribution
The tree is endemic to Brazil, in the Santo André area of São Paulo state.

It is native to the Atlantic Forest ecoregion, within the Serra de Paranapiacaba range.

Conservation
Ocotea basicordatifolia is an IUCN Red List endangered species, threatened by industrial pollution and habitat loss.

References

basicordatifolia
Endemic flora of Brazil
Flora of the Atlantic Forest
Flora of São Paulo (state)
Trees of Brazil
Endangered flora of South America
Taxonomy articles created by Polbot